William Draper Best, 1st Baron Wynford, PC (13 December 1767 – 3 March 1845), was a British politician and judge. He served as Chief Justice of the Common Pleas from 1824 to 1829.

Background and education
Best was the third son of Thomas Best of Haselbury Plucknett in Somerset. He was educated at Crewkerne Grammar School and became a student at Wadham College, Oxford at the age of 15, but left at 17 without a degree. Originally destined for a career in the Church, he instead chose to study law, and entered the Middle Temple on 9 October 1784.

Legal career

Best was Called to the Bar on 6 November 1789, and established a successful legal practice.  In 1802, he was elected to parliament for Petersfield as a Whig, a seat he held until 1806. After joining the Tories, he sat for Bridport from 1812 to 1817 and then represented Guildford from 1818 to 1819. 

In 1813, Best was appointed Solicitor-General to the Prince of Wales, which he remained until 1816, and was then Attorney-General to the Prince of Wales from 1816 to 1818 and Chief Justice of Chester in 1818. The following year he was made a Judge of the Common Pleas and knighted. Best was admitted to the Privy Council in 1824 and appointed Chief Justice of the Common Pleas, in which post he remained until 1829. 

The latter year Best was raised to the peerage as Baron Wynford, of Wynford Eagle in the County of Dorset. 

Lord Wynford later served as a Deputy Speaker of the House of Lords. Despite his earlier affiliation with the Whigs, he became known as an ardent Tory, and vigorously opposed the 1832 Reform Act. Lord Wynford suffered from gout for many years, and was carried into the House of Lords in an arm-chair, in which he was also allowed to address the rest of the house. However, he was later forced to retire from public life due to his illness.

Family

In 1794, Lord Wynford married Mary Anne, daughter of Jerome Knapp Jr. of Chilton in Berkshire (now Oxfordshire), Clerk of the Haberdashers' Company, by his second wife, Sarah, daughter and eventual heiress of George Noyes of Southcote, Berkshire, and Andover, Hampshire. They lived at Wynford House at Wynford Eagle, Dorset where they raised ten children. He died in March 1845, aged 77, and was succeeded in the barony by his eldest son, William Samuel Best. Lord Wynford's daughter, Grace Anne Best, married Philip Lake Godsal, the grandfather of Philip Thomas Godsal.

Arms

References

Kidd, Charles, Williamson, David (editors). Debrett's Peerage and Baronetage (1990 edition). New York: St Martin's Press, 1990,

External links 
 
 

1767 births
1845 deaths
Barons in the Peerage of the United Kingdom
Peers of the United Kingdom created by George IV
Chief Justices of the Common Pleas
Members of the Parliament of the United Kingdom for English constituencies
UK MPs 1807–1812
UK MPs 1812–1818
UK MPs 1818–1820
UK MPs who were granted peerages
Justices of the King's Bench
Politicians from Dorset
Members of the Privy Council of the United Kingdom
Knights Bachelor